, also known as , was the official wife of , the 13th shōgun of the Tokugawa shogunate of Japan.

She was originally named  by her parents.

Biography

Tenshōin was born in Kagoshima in 1835. In 1853, she became the adopted daughter of Shimazu Nariakira. On August 21, 1853, she travelled by land from Kagoshima via Kokura to the Edo jurisdiction, never to return to Kagoshima again.

Atsuko was thought to have been sent to Edo Castle with the aim of helping Shimazu Nariakira politically. The question of the next heir to the shogunate was divided between the choice of Tokugawa Yoshinobu, then head of the Hitotsubashi-Tokugawa house and Tokugawa Yoshitomi, then head of Kii-Tokugawa house. In order to ensure that Yoshinobu became the next in succession, Atsuko was arranged to wed into the Tokugawa clan.

On 18 November 1856, Atsuko married Tokugawa Iesada and became a Midaidokoro. In 1858, both Tokugawa Iesada and Shimazu Nariakira died. The 14th shōgun was decided to be Iesada's cousin and adopted son, Tokugawa Iemochi. Following the demise of her husband, Atsuko took the tonsure, becoming a  Buddhist nun, and took the name Tenshōin on 26 August 1858, and she was given Junior Third Rank. In 1862, as part of the Kōbu Gattai ("Union of Court and Bakufu") movement, Iemochi was married to Imperial Princess Kazu-no-Miya Chikako daughter of Emperor Ninkō, and younger sister of Emperor Kōmei. The Satsuma clan brought up the request for Tenshōin to return to Satsuma, but was rejected by Tenshōin herself. In 1866, Iemochi died. Tokugawa Yoshinobu became the next shōgun. During the Meiji Restoration, Tenshōin and her daughter in law, Seikan'in (Kazu-no-Miya's name after tonsure) helped negotiate for the peaceful surrender of Edo Castle.

She spent her remaining years nurturing Tokugawa Iesato, the 16th head of the Tokugawa clan. She moved into the Tokugawa residence in Sendagaya, in the Shibuya district, Tokyo. She suffered from Parkinson's disease which eventually took her life on November 20th, 1883, at the age of 47. She was buried in Kaneiji in Ueno, Tokyo, together with her husband, Onkyoin (Iesada). Beside Onkyoin and Tenshoin tombs, There is loquat tree planted there as it was Tenshoin's favorite food.

The 2008 NHK Taiga drama Atsuhime was a fifty-episode television dramatization of her life.

Family
 Father: Shimazu Tadatake (1806–1854)
 Mother: Lady Oyuki
 Adoptive Fathers:
 Shimazu Nariakira
 Konoe Tadahiro
 Adoptive Mothers:
 Tsunehime (1805–1858), daughter of Tokugawa Nariatsu and wife of Shimazu Nariakira
 Shimazu Kyoko or Ikuhime (1807–1850) sister of Shimazu Nariakira and wife of Konoe Tadahiro
 Uncle: Shimazu Hisamitsu
 Husband: Tokugawa Iesada
 Adopted son: Tokugawa Iemochi

Honours
 Junior Third Rank

Shimazu clan
Tokugawa clan
19th-century Buddhist nuns
Japanese Buddhist nuns
Neurological disease deaths in Japan
Deaths from Parkinson's disease
1883 deaths
1836 births